Mare Island Naval Shipyard Airfield was a post World War 1 US Navy airfield that opened in 1922 and closed in 1937. The Langley was converted to an aircraft carrier in 1920 at Mare Island Naval Shipyard from the collier USS Jupiter. The airfield was located at 13th Street & Flagship Drive in the City of Vallejo, California just west of the shipyard near San Pablo Bay. The airfield had a single unpaved runway for day use only. Common aircraft at the airfield were Vought FU, Vought VE-7 and Curtiss JN-4 Jenny. USS Langley could hold 36 planes, but need to remove planes to Mare Island Naval Shipyard Airfield when the ship was under repair. The Mare Island Naval Shipyard Airfield was also used for some training. The Mare Island Naval Shipyard Airfield closed as Naval Air Station Alameda was picked to be the Navy's main support base for aircraft carriers in San Francisco Bay.

See also

California during World War II
American Theater (1939–1945)
United States home front during World War II

References

 Alameda Naval Air Museum
 Historic Posts: Naval Air Station, Alameda

Mare Island Naval Shipyard Airfield
Mare Island Naval Shipyard Airfield
Alameda
Military Superfund sites
Military facilities in the San Francisco Bay Area
Closed installations of the United States Navy
1922 establishments in California
1937 disestablishments in California